Saintard is a town in the Arcahaie commune in the Arcahaie Arrondissement, in the Ouest department of Haiti. In 2009, the town had 32,906 inhabitants. It is the largest urban area in Arcahaie commune.

See also
Arcahaie, for a list of other settlements in the commune.

References

Populated places in Ouest (department)